Kerry Isabelle Greenwood  (born 1954) is an Australian author and lawyer. She has written many plays and books, most notably a string of historical detective novels centred on the character of Phryne Fisher, which was adapted as the popular television series Miss Fisher's Murder Mysteries. She writes mysteries, science-fiction, historical fiction, children's stories, and plays. Greenwood earned the Australian women's crime fiction Davitt Award in 2002 for her young adult novel The Three-Pronged Dagger.

Early life and education
Greenwood grew up in the Melbourne suburb of Footscray, where she still lives today. She attended Geelong Road State School (now Footscray Primary School), Maribyrnong College and the University of Melbourne, where she graduated with Bachelor of Arts (English) and Bachelor of Laws degrees in 1979. Whilst at university, Greenwood worked at a women's refuge.

Career 
In 1982, Greenwood was admitted as a barrister and solicitor of the Supreme Court of Victoria, and worked full-time as a criminal defence lawyer for Victoria Legal Aid until becoming a professional writer. Since that time, she has remained a locum duty solicitor for Legal Aid, practising in the Sunshine Magistrates' Court.

She began writing books at sixteen, but remained unpublished. In 1988 she entered one of her eight novels for the Vogel prize; although not successful, one of the judges offered her a contract for two detective novels.

In the 2020 Australia Day Honours Greenwood was awarded the Medal of the Order of Australia (OAM).

Personal life 
Greenwood lives with a "wizard", the mathematician and author David Greagg.

Books

Phryne Fisher historical mysteries

Corinna Chapman mysteries

Delphic Women
 Cassandra (1995)
 Electra (1996)
 Medea (1997)

Spinouts (with Michael Pryor and Catherine Randle)
 The Bold and The Brave (2000)

Stormbringer
The Broken Wheel, Whaleroad, Cave Rats and Feral are prequels to the Stormbringer trilogy. Characters in Stormbringer refer to events in those books, but are otherwise independent.
 The Rat and the Raven (2005)
 Lightning Nest (2006)
 Ravens Rising (2006)

Novels

Collections
 Recipes for Crime (1995) (with Jenny Pausacker)

Anthologies edited
 Bad to the Bones (2002)

Short fiction
"Jetsam" (1998) in Dreaming Down-Under (ed. Jack Dann, Janeen Webb)

Non-fiction
 On Murder: True Crime Writing in Australia (2000)
 On Murder 2: True Crime Writing in Australia (2002)
 Tamam Shud: The Somerton Man Mystery (2012)

TV and film
The Miss Fisher's Murder Mysteries television series was filmed in and around Melbourne in 2011 and premiered on ABC1 on 24 February 2012. A second series was commissioned in August 2012 and filming began in February 2013 and aired starting 6 September 2013.  A third series was commissioned in June 2014 and began airing on 8 May 2015.

A film that continues the story started in the television series was released in 2022: Miss Fisher and the Crypt of Tears.

The TV series was redone by HBO Asia in 2020 as Miss S, set in Shanghai in the 1930's instead of Melbourne in the 1920's. The show was filmed in Mandarin, Miss Phryne Fisher was renamed as Su Wenli, Inspector Robinson was renamed as Luo Qiuheng, and Dorothy 'Dot' Williams was renamed as Xiao Tao Zi.

Awards and nominations

Aurealis Award for Excellence in Australian Speculative Fiction, Young Adult Division, Best Novel, 1996: joint winner for The Broken Wheel
Children's Book Council of Australia Book of the Year Award, Book of the Year: Younger Readers, 2002: honour book for A Different Sort of Real : The Diary of Charlotte McKenzie, Melbourne 1918–1919
Davitt Award, Best Young Fiction Book, 2002: winner for The Three-Pronged Dagger
Davitt Award, Best Young Fiction Book, 2003: nominated for The Wandering Icon
Davitt Award, Best Adult Novel, 2003: nominated for Murder in Montparnasse : A Phryne Fisher Mystery
Ned Kelly Award for Crime Writing, Lifetime Contribution, 2003
Ned Kelly Award for Crime Writing, Best Novel, 2005: shortlisted for Heavenly Pleasures : A Corinna Chapman Novel
Ned Kelly Award for Crime Writing, Best Novel, 2005: shortlisted for Queen of the Flowers : A Phryne Fisher Mystery
New South Wales Premier's Literary Awards, Patricia Wrightson Prize for Children's Books, 2006: shortlisted for Journey to Eureka
Davitt Award, Readers' Choice Award, 2006: joint winner for Heavenly Pleasures : A Corinna Chapman Novel
Davitt Award, Readers' Choice Award, 2007: joint winner for Devil's Food
Ned Kelly Award for Crime Writing, Best Novel, 2008: nominated for Trick or Treat
 Awarded Sisters in Crime Lifetime Achievement Award 2013 AU

References

External links
Phryne Fisher's website
Corinna Chapman's website
Interview with Kerry Greenwood at Allen & Unwin
Sue Ryan-Fazilleau, "Kerry Greenwood's 'Rewriting' of Agatha Christie", JASAL 7 (2007)

1954 births
Australian women novelists
Australian crime writers
Australian mystery writers
Living people
Ned Kelly Award winners
20th-century Australian novelists
21st-century Australian novelists
Writers from Melbourne
20th-century Australian women writers
21st-century Australian women writers
Women mystery writers
Writers of historical mysteries
Recipients of the Medal of the Order of Australia
People from Footscray, Victoria